Phyllonorycter hancola is a moth of the family Gracillariidae. It is known from the islands of Hokkaidō and Honshū in Japan and from the Russian Far East.

The larvae feed on Alnus hirsuta and Alnus japonica. They mine the leaves of their host plant. The mine has the form of a ptychonomous leaf mine, occurring upon the lower surface of leaves.

References

hancola
Moths of Asia

Moths of Japan
Moths described in 1958
Taxa named by Tosio Kumata
Leaf miners
Insects of Russia